Kurt Gustav Wilckens (November 3, 1886 – June 15, 1923) was a German anarchist, known in Argentina for having avenged the massacre of hundreds of workers on strike in the repression unleashed by the Argentine government in response to the prolonged Patagonia rebelde labor uprising. Wilckens assassinated Lieutenant Colonel , the military leader in charge of the brutal repression.

References 
 Osvaldo Bayer, Los anarquistas expropiadores, Simón Radowitzky y otros ensayos. Galerna, Buenos Aires, 1974.
 Osvaldo Bayer, La Patagonia rebelde, Tomo IV. Booket, Buenos Aires, 2007.

External links 
 
 

1886 births
1923 deaths
People from Bad Bramstedt
People from the Province of Schleswig-Holstein
Industrial Workers of the World members
German emigrants to Argentina
Argentine anarchists
People murdered in Argentina
Anarchist assassins
Murdered anarchists
Argentine murder victims
Prisoners who died in Argentine detention
Prisoners murdered in custody
Deaths by firearm in Argentina
German people murdered abroad